The 1935 World Table Tennis Championships were held at the Imperial Institute, South Kensington in London with the finals at the Wembley Sports Arena, from February 8 to February 16, 1935.

The championships attracted 19 countries and the finals attendance was in excess of 8,000.

Medalists

Team

Individual

References

External links
ITTF Museum

 
World Table Tennis Championships
World Table Tennis Championships
World Table Tennis Championships
Table tennis competitions in the United Kingdom
World Table Tennis Championships
International sports competitions in London
World Table Tennis Championships